This Is the Ice Age was Martha and the Muffins' third album, released on LP and cassette in 1981. The track "Women Around the World at Work" was released as a single in the UK and Canada (#24). "Swimming", featuring a lead vocal by Mark Gane, was also issued as a single in Canada.

The album was a debut for Daniel Lanois as a rock music producer; he would later (often in partnership with Brian Eno) produce for artists as diverse as U2, Bob Dylan, and Dashboard Confessional.  Daniel's sister Jocelyne was a member of the band, playing bass and singing backing vocals on this album.

The cover image was taken by Muffins' guitarist Mark Gane from an apartment he was living in on Bloor Street in Toronto.  It depicts the Bank of Montreal's headquarters, First Canadian Place over a building in poor repair.

After being unavailable for over 20 years, this much sought-after album was finally re-released on CD in 2005 by EMI Canada and includes two bonus tracks that were not on the original release. The CD was released with copy protection technology, which may make it difficult to play in some players or rip for use on MP3 players.

The working title for this album was The Big Merge.

Track listing

 "I'm No Good At Conversation" was the B-side of the "Several Styles of Blonde Girls Dancing" single from Danseparc.
 "Twenty-two in Cincinnati" was the B-side of the "Women Around the World at Work" single.

Personnel
Martha Johnson - keyboards, vocals
Mark Gane -  guitar, vocals
Jocelyne Lanois - bass
Tim Gane - drum kit
Andy Haas - saxophone

with:

Daniel Lanois - treatments
Glenn Schellenberg - piano
George Axon - percussion
Alyx Skriabow, Sandy Horne, Corinne Plomish, Gordon Deppe - background vocals

References

1981 albums
Martha and the Muffins albums
Albums produced by Daniel Lanois